Greysteel or Gresteel is a village in County Londonderry, Northern Ireland. It is designated as a Large Village and in the 2001 Census it had a population of 1,229 people, an increase of almost 20% compared to 1991. It is situated within Causeway Coast and Glens district.

History
The village lies mostly within the townlands of Gresteel More and Gresteel Beg. The name "Greysteel" may be a part-translation of the Irish Glas-stiall, meaning "grey strip (of land)", and the Placenames Database of Ireland gives this as the Irish name of the village. An older English name for the area was "Glasteele".

The Troubles
During the Troubles, nine people were killed in the Greysteel area:
On 14 November 1976, Jim Loughrey was shot dead by loyalists at his home.
On 30 October 1993, members of the Ulster Defence Association carried out a mass shooting at the Rising Sun public house, killing eight civilians. This became known as the Greysteel massacre.

Features

Places of interest
Nearby Faughanvale Old church dates back to the medieval period and is dedicated to Saint Canice.

Transport
The village is adequately served in terms of public transport and City of Derry Airport is located 4 km to the west.

Sport
Faughanvale GAC is the local Gaelic Athletic Association club.

2001 Census 
Greysteel is classified as a village by the NI Statistics and Research Agency (NISRA) (i.e. with a population between 1,000 and 2,250 people). On Census day (29 April 2001) there were 1,229 people living in Greysteel. Of these:
25.4% were aged under 16 years and 11.7% were aged 60 and over
50.2% of the population were male and 49.8% were female
96.6% were from a Catholic background and 2.9% were from a Protestant background
0.8% of people aged 16–74 were unemployed.

For more details see: NI Neighbourhood Information Service

See also 
List of towns and villages in Northern Ireland

References 

Villages in County Londonderry
Causeway Coast and Glens district